
Year 461 (CDLXI) was a common year starting on Sunday (link will display the full calendar) of the Julian calendar. At the time, it was known as the Year of the Consulship of Severinus and Dagalaiphus (or, less frequently, year 1214 Ab urbe condita). The denomination 461 for this year has been used since the early medieval period, when the Anno Domini calendar era became the prevalent method in Europe for naming years.

Events 
 By place 
 Roman Empire 
 August 2 – Majorian is arrested near Tortona (Northern Italy), and deposed by Ricimer (magister militum) as puppet emperor. 
 August 7 – Majorian, having been beaten and tortured for five days, is beheaded near the Iria River (Lombardy). 
 King Genseric continues the Vandal raids on the coast of Sicily and Italy. Ricimer sends an embassy to Carthage.
 Olybrius becomes the second candidate for the western throne. He is the husband of Placidia, who is being held in Vandal captivity.    
 November 19 – Libius Severus, Roman senator from Lucania, is declared emperor of the Western Roman Empire.

 Europe 
 The Visigoths under king Theodoric II recapture Septimania (Southern Gaul) after the assassination of Majorian, and invade Hispania again. 
 Aegidius becomes ruler over the Domain of Soissons (Gaul). He has friendly relations with the Romano-British (in Brittany).

 Anatolia 
461 Apahunik' earthquake. It affected the province of Apahunik', located to the north of Lake Van, in Anatolia.

 By topic 
 Religion 
 November 10 – Pope Leo I dies at Rome, age 61 (approximate), after a 21-year reign in which he has resisted Manichaeism and defended the Church against Nestorianism. He is succeeded by Hilarius as the 46th pope.
 Mamertus is elected bishop of Vienne (Gaul).

Births 
 Hilderic, king of the Vandals (approximate date)
 Romulus Augustulus, emperor of the Western Roman Empire

Deaths 
 August 7 – Majorian, emperor of the Western Roman Empire
 November 10 – Pope Leo I
 Palladius, first bishop of Ireland (approximate date)

References

Sources